Chilo diffusilinea is a moth in the family Crambidae. It was described by Joseph de Joannis in 1927. It is found in Malawi, Mozambique, Tanzania and Zimbabwe.

References

Chiloini
Moths described in 1927
Moths of Sub-Saharan Africa
Lepidoptera of Malawi
Lepidoptera of Mozambique
Lepidoptera of Tanzania
Lepidoptera of Zimbabwe